Dread Mountain is the fifth book in the Deltora Quest children's fantasy series written by Emily Rodda. It continues the quest of Lief, Barda, and Jasmine to find the seven missing gems of Deltora, braving dangers and Guardians in each book. The fourth gem has been found and the fifth is hidden in Dread Mountain. The trio travel to the mountains in search for the emerald.

Plot summary
The trio is journeying to Dread Mountain when they come across a spring. Although initially distrustful of its contents, they drink the water out of thirst, noting a nearby sign saying: "Drink, gentle stranger, and welcome. All of evil will beware." and several oddly shaped rocks encircling the spring. They decided to take a rest there and Lief awakens to find one of the "rocks" unfurling. It reveals itself to be a mammalian flying creature called the Kin, which most Deltorans believe to be extinct. It explains to Lief that the water from the spring makes one dream of whomever one is thinking of during ingestion. It also has a deadly, paralyzing effect on "those with evil intent". The three head to Dread Mountain with the help of the Kin, landing there only to find the mountain thickly overgrown, deserted of its inhabitants, the Dread gnomes, and overrun by beasts. However, the companions find the entrance into the Mountain, and after avoiding the numerous traps the gnomes have set up to repel invaders, it was discovered that there is a monstrous toad named Gellick that was controlling the gnomes. The trio makes a bargain with the head of the gnomes to rid Gellick for them in return for freedom and the emerald that was studded onto Gellick the giant frog's head. The fight ends with Lief tossing water from the Dreaming Spring into Gellick's mouth, as it uses the deadly, paralyzing effect. The gnomes thank Lief by making peace with their longtime prey, the Kin, and agreeing to hamper the progress of their common enemy, the Shadow Lord in finding the trio. The companions then continue their journey to The Maze of the Beast.

Characters
Lief: Lief is the main character of the series. Lief was born to parents King Endon and Queen Sharn though he believed them to be Jarred and Anna of the forge. As a child Lief roamed the streets of Del, sharpening his wits and gaining him the skills needed for his future quests. Though he did not know it, he was constantly protected by Barda and he prided himself on his many 'lucky' escapes. On his sixteenth birthday it is revealed to him that he must begin a dangerous quest to find the lost gems of the Belt of Deltora.
Barda: Barda was enlisted as a friend by the king and queen of Deltora and was trusted to help him find the lost gems of Deltora sixteen years before the initial story took place. For the next sixteen years Barda disguised himself as a beggar so as to discover information vital to the quest. He also became the bodyguard of Endon and Sharn's child Lief, albeit without the semi-arrogant Lief's knowledge thereof. Upon Lief's sixteenth birthday Barda revealed himself to Lief and the quest for the gems of Deltora began. Though Barda was at first annoyed to travel encumbered by a child, he soon saw Lief as more of a help than a hindrance.
Jasmine: Jasmine is a wild girl, described as having wild black hair (dark green hair in the anime) and emerald green eyes who has grown up in the Forests of Silence, where Lief and Barda meet her shortly after leaving Del. Her parents, Jarred and Anna, were captured by Grey Guards when she was seven years old, and so she has been raised by the forest. She can understand the language of the trees and of many animals, and has incredibly sharp senses, but has trouble understanding some social customs. Jasmine is usually seen with her raven, Kree, and a mouse-like creature she calls Filli. Jasmine is like Lief and occasionally has a quick temper. After helping Lief and Barda in the forest and with the help of the topaz, she is greeted by her mother's spirit from beyond the grave, who tells her to go with Lief and Barda in their quest. After this encounter, she joins Lief and Barda in the search for the great gems that will complete the Belt.

See also

Deltora Quest 1
Deltora Quest (series)
Jennifer Rowe
List of Deltora Quest characters

External links
USA Deltora website
Australian Deltora Quest website
Emily Rodda's official website

2001 Australian novels
2001 fantasy novels
Australian children's novels
Australian fantasy novels
Children's fantasy novels
Deltora
Fictional mountains
2001 children's books